"Black and Gold" is the lead single from Australian singer Sam Sparro's eponymous debut album. The song was written by Sparro (Sam Falson) and Jesse Rogg. It has been remixed by Max Sanna and Steve Pitron, Paul Epworth, Al Usher, Kings of the Universe, Kromatik and Russ Chimes. The original version of the single was made available online on 23 March 2008, with the entire album available from 31 March. On 7 April, the CD, 12-inch, and limited edition 7-inch singles were released.

"Black and Gold" explores the relationship between reason, spirituality and love. It was a commercial success upon release, reaching number two in the United Kingdom, number four in Australia, and number five in Ireland and Turkey. It was also a top 20 hit in Flemish Belgium, Denmark, Italy, and New Zealand. The song was nominated for Best Dance Recording at the 2009 Grammy Awards. It was also included on the soundtrack of EA Sports football video game FIFA 09 & FIFA 23.

Information
"Black and Gold" originally appeared on the Modus Vivendi Music Vol.2 compilation album, released in 2007, along with an alternate mix of the song "Sally" and Sparro's remix of "Young Lovers", by another Modus Vivendi artist, Love Grenades. Modus Vivendi Music released an EP entitled Black + Gold, featuring the song, in the autumn of 2007, which garnered the attention that led to the deal with Island UK. All songs from that EP, excluding "Miss Rexi", appear in new revisions on Sparro's debut eponymous studio album, released with Island UK in May 2008.

"Black and Gold" was made available as a digital download (via the Apple iTunes Store) on 23 March 2008 as the lead single from Sam Sparro. The song was released by Island UK Records through a licensing deal with independent Los Angeles based label, Modus Vivendi Music, owned and operated by Jesse Rogg, who also produced and co-wrote the song with Sparro.

British singer Adele performed an acoustic cover of the song for her appearance on a 2008 Live Lounge episode.

The song was nominated for the  Grammy Award for "Best Dance Recording". It received three nominations for the 2008 ARIA Awards in the categories for "Breakthrough Artist – Single", "Best Pop Release" and "Single of the Year". The song has been certified gold in both Australia and the UK.

In a video interview, Sparro confirmed that the song's subject is his religious faith, saying "It is about God, yeah. [...] I do like to have faith in something that is bigger than me."

The song was used in the 2009 films Obsessed and Fame, and appears on their official soundtrack releases. The song appears on the soundtrack of the video game, FIFA 09, as well as appearing in the 2010 video game DJ Hero 2, where it was mixed with David Guetta's "Love Is Gone". On January 10, 2010, the song played over an action scene in Season 3, Episode 1 of Chuck, "Chuck Versus the Pink Slip".

The song was later sampled by British rock band Coldplay on "People of the Pride", a track from their 2021 album Music of the Spheres.

Music video
There were two music videos produced for "Black and Gold".

The first was directed by Mariah Garnett. Sparro appears dressed in black, white, and gold clothing, singing alone, cut between city views, shots of urban streets filmed from moving cars, and reverse action shots of gold colored drinking glasses shattering against a black back drop. The video had a significantly low budget, and was later scrapped after Sparro's deal with Island Records.

The second music video was directed by AlexandLiane, funded through Sparro's new contract. The music video depicts Sparro emerging from a Limousine with many copies of himself in an underground garage.  The garage, illuminated by chains of lights, pulsating as Sparro and his copies dance, donning tuxedos decorated with lights. The video has a color theme of black and gold after the title, a theme reminiscent of the first video. It was released in February 2008.

The second video, directed by AlexandLiane, received a nomination for "Best Dance Video" at the 2009 MTV Australia Awards.

Awards and nominations
ARIA Music Awards

|-
| rowspan=3 | 2008 || rowspan=3 | "Black and Gold" || Breakthrough Artist – Single || 
|-
| Best Pop Release || 
|-
| Single of the Year || 

Grammy Awards

|-
|  || "Black and Gold" || Best Dance Recording || 

MTV Australia Awards

|-
| 2009 || "Black and Gold" || Best Dance Video ||

Track listings
UK CD single
 "Black and Gold" (radio edit) – 3:30
 "S.A.M.S.P.A.R.R.O." – 2:32

German CD single
 "Black and Gold" (radio edit) – 3:30
 "Black and Gold" (Phones Hard as Diamond) – 5:02
 "Black and Gold" (Al Usher mix) – 4:35
 "Black and Gold" (video) – 3:39

12-inch single
 "Black and Gold" (Max Sanna & Steve Pitron mix) – 8:33
 "Black and Gold" (Al Usher remix) – 8:15
 "Black and Gold" (Phones Hard as Diamond mix – dub) – 6:32

Personnel
Credits adapted from the liner notes of Sam Sparro.

 Richard Edgeler – assistance
 Jesse Rogg – writing, mixing, production
 Sam Sparro – vocals, keyboards, writing, production
 Mark Rankin – drum programming
 Brio Taliaferro – additional programming
 Jeremy Wheatley – mixing

Charts and certifications

Weekly charts

Year-end charts

Decade-end charts

Certifications

Release history

References

2008 singles
2008 songs
Island Records singles
Neo soul songs
Number-one singles in Scotland
Sam Sparro songs
Songs written by Jesse Rogg
Songs written by Sam Sparro